The Boston mayoral election of 1887 saw the reelection of Hugh O'Brien to a fourth consecutive term.

Results

See also
List of mayors of Boston, Massachusetts

References

Mayoral elections in Boston
Boston
Boston mayoral
19th century in Boston